Wavertree railway station was a station in Wavertree, Liverpool, Merseyside, England.

History 
The station opened on 1 September 1870 by the London and North Western Railway. The line was quadrupled as far as Ditton Junction on 13 July 1891, when the station entrance was moved and the station itself may have been rebuilt. The station had a substantial booking office at street level on the west side of the line and on the south side of Wellington Road. A subway connected to four platforms situated on an embankment well above street level. The platforms had timber-built waiting facilities. The station closed on 5 August 1958 shortly before the line was electrified. No trace of the station remains at track level.

References

Disused railway stations in Liverpool
Railway stations in Great Britain opened in 1870
Railway stations in Great Britain closed in 1958
Former London and North Western Railway stations